Blues Suite is an album by American jazz composer and arranger A. K. Salim featuring Nat Adderley and Phil Woods recorded in 1958 for the Savoy label.

Reception

Allmusic reviewer Jim Todd states "This set of mid-tempo, blues-based arrangements performed by an all-star group is a good idea that falls short in its execution. ...Dreary is too strong a word, but certainly dull".

Track listing
All compositions by A. K. Salim
 "Pay Day" - 3:56
 "Joy Box" - 6:03
 "Full Moon" - 5:12
 "Blue Baby" - 3:39
 "The Sultan" - 4:25
 "Blue Shout" - 3:25
 "Like How Long Baby" - 4:59

Personnel 
A. K. Salim - arranger, director
Nat Adderley - cornet
Paul Cohen, Joe Wilder - trumpet
Buster Cooper - trombone
Phil Woods - alto saxophone
Seldon Powell - tenor saxophone, flute
Sahib Shihab - baritone saxophone
Oscar Dennard - piano
Eddie Costa - piano, vibraphone
George Duvivier - bass
Granville Hogan - drums

References 

1958 albums
A. K. Salim albums
Savoy Records albums
Albums produced by Ozzie Cadena
Albums recorded at Van Gelder Studio